Utricularia tridactyla is an annual, terrestrial carnivorous plant that belongs to the genus Utricularia (family Lentibulariaceae). It is endemic to  northeastern Kimberley region in Western Australia.

See also 
 List of Utricularia species

References 

Carnivorous plants of Australia
Eudicots of Western Australia
tridactyla
Lamiales of Australia